Hrvatsko may refer to:

 Hrvatsko, an adjectival form of the Croatian words for Croatia, cf. "hrvatski"
 Hrvatsko, Primorje-Gorski Kotar County, a village near Delnice, Croatia
 Hrvatsko Selo, a village near Topusko, Croatia